Zev Segal ( – ) was an Orthodox Jewish rabbi.

Biography
Segal was born in Saratov, Russia and moved to Palestine as a toddler.  He survived the 1929 Hebron massacre. He was the founding rabbi of the Young Israel of Newark, and served there for thirty-three years, from 1945 to 1978. During this period, Segal also served a three-year term as president of the Rabbinical Council of America, from 1968 to 1971.

Segal was the father of radio broadcaster Nachum Segal, and Rabbi Nate Segal of Staten Island.

Segal was found dead in his car at the bottom of the Hackensack River on March 6, 2008, after being reported missing a day earlier.  He was traveling from an appearance on his son's radio show to an appointment in Livingston, New Jersey.  Segal was 91.

References

American Orthodox rabbis
American Zionists
1917 births
2008 deaths
20th-century American rabbis
21st-century American Jews